Arturo Arias (Guatemala City, 1950) is a Guatemalan novelist and critic. His early life was marked by the overthrow of democracy in 1954, and the ensuing military dictatorships and civil rebellions. These experiences, along with a visit to refugee camps on the Guatemala-Mexico border in 1982, sparked his dedication to peoples and Indigenous rights and inspired his scholarly research.

Career 
Arias is a John D. and Catherine T. MacArthur professor of 20th-century Spanish-American Literature at the University of California, Merced. He has taught courses specializing in: Central American literature; Indigenous literatures; social and critical theory; race, gender and sexuality in post-colonial societies; cultural studies, and ethnographic approaches.  Arias previously taught at San Francisco State University, the University of Redlands in Southern California, and the University of Texas at Austin, where he was the Tomás Rivera Regents Professor in Spanish Language and Literature. He is a past president of the Latin American Studies Association. He holds a PhD in Sociology of Literature, from L'Ecole des Hautes Etudes Paris, France. (1978)

Arias has held several prestigious fellowships—the Guggenheim (John Simon Guggenheim Memorial Foundation), the Hood (University of Auckland) and the Martha Sutton Weeks (Stanford Humanities Center)--as well as distinguished visiting posts at Princeton, Tulane, and the University of Oregon.

Arias has published numerous novels, as well as scholarly books and journal articles, in English and Spanish.  He received the Casa de las Américas Prize for his novel Itzam Na (1981), the Anna Seghers award for his novel Jaguar en llamas (1990), and the Casa de las Américas prize in essay for his book Ideología, Literatura y Sociedad durante la Revolución Guatemalteca, 1944-1954 (1979). In 2008, he was honored with the Miguel Angel Asturias National Award for Lifetime Achievement in Literature in his native Guatemala.

His books in English include  Recovering Lost Footprints: Contemporary Maya Narratives. Volumes 1 and 2, The Rigoberta Menchú Controversy, Taking their Word: Literature and the Signs of Central America, After the Bombs, and Rattlesnake.

List of works in English
. Trans. Asa Zatz.
.

Rattlesnake Curbstone Press (2003)  (spy thriller)

Awards
Anna Seghers Prize 1990 for his novel Jaguar en llamas
Academy Award Nomination 1985 for Best Original Screenplay (El Norte); co-writer
Casa de las Américas Prize 1981 for his novel Itzam-Na
Casa de las Américas Prize 1979 for his essay Ideologías, literatura y sociedad durante la revolución guatemalteca 1944-1954
Miguel Angel Asturias National Award for Lifetime Achievement in Literature 2008
Guggenheim Fellowship 2020

References 

 Arturo Arias - Academic Biography
 Arturo Arias - John Simon Guggenheim Memorial Foundation

Guatemalan novelists
Guatemalan male writers
Male novelists
Latin Americanists
Living people
1950 births